Pirkko Ritva Aro (née Ihari; 28 March 1923, Vihti – 9 November 2012) was a Finnish journalist and politician. She began her political career as a city councillor for the Liberal League. Later she was elected to the Parliament of Finland, where she represented the Liberal People's Party (LKP) from 1966 to 1973 and the Social Democratic Party of Finland (SDP) from 1973 to 1979.

References

1923 births
2012 deaths
People from Vihti
Liberal League (Finland) politicians
Liberals (Finland) politicians
Social Democratic Party of Finland politicians
Members of the Parliament of Finland (1966–70)
Members of the Parliament of Finland (1970–72)
Members of the Parliament of Finland (1972–75)
Members of the Parliament of Finland (1975–79)
University of Helsinki alumni
20th-century Finnish women politicians
Women members of the Parliament of Finland